Wolf is an American crime drama television series starring Jack Scalia and Nicolas Surovy which aired on CBS from September 13, 1989 to June 28, 1990. It features Scalia as Tony Wolf, a former cop turned private detective, with Surovy as the district attorney who had caused him to be discharged from the force. Joseph Sirola starred as Wolf's father, Sal who lived on a boat.

Plot
Tony Wolf was a San Francisco policeman who now works as a fisherman and sometime private eye. Originally a narcotics officer for the SFPD, Tony was framed and took the fall as a crooked cop. Drummed off the force, he wandered the world for a couple of years, before finally returning home to The City to make amends with his aging father and to take over the family fishing boat. He's also tried to re-kindle a relationship with Connie, an old flame.

Cast
Jack Scalia as Tony Wolf
Joseph Sirola as Sal Lupo
Nicolas Surovy as Dylan Elliott
J.C. Brandy as Angeline Bacarri
Mimi Kuzyk as Connie Bacarri
Judith Hoag as Melissa Shaw Elliott

Episode list

References 
The Thrilling Detective on Wolf

External links

CBS original programming
1980s American crime drama television series
1990s American crime drama television series
1989 American television series debuts
1990 American television series endings
Television shows set in San Francisco
Television series by CBS Studios
American detective television series